Luke the Labourer; Or, The Lost Son is an 1826 play by the British writer John Baldwin Buckstone. It was originally performed at the Adelphi Theatre in London's West End. The play addressed the recent spate of rural unrest in Britain, choosing to set it in the present rather than more safely in a historical setting as other works did. The play is notable for its title character, a sympathetic villain.

The play was a popular success, and for forty years became a staple of both provincial theatres and several London revivals.

References

Bibliography
 Burwick, Frederick. British Drama of the Industrial Revolution. Cambridge University Press, 2015.
 Gressman, Malcolm George. The Career of John Baldwin Buckstone. Ohio State University, 1963.
 Nicoll, Allardyce. A History of Early Nineteenth Century Drama 1800-1850. Cambridge University Press, 1930.

1826 plays
West End plays
Plays by John Baldwin Buckstone
Plays set in England